Chess was contested at the 2013 Summer Universiade from July 9 to 15 in Kazan, Russia.

Medal summary

Medal table

Medal events

References

External links
2013 Summer Universiade – Chess
Results book

Chess
2013 in chess
Chess in Russia
Chess competitions
2013